Cedar Creek is an  tributary of the South Fork Eel River in Mendocino County in the U.S. state of California. It makes an S-curve west-northwest then bends sharply south, dropping into the valley of the South Fork Eel. The confluence is south of the city of Leggett, on the river's right bank. The only named tributary of Cedar Creek is Little Cedar Creek, a headwaters tributary. Big Dann Creek joins the South Fork Eel on the same bank, just upstream of Cedar Creek, while the next major tributary downstream of Cedar is Rock Creek. The Cedar Creek watershed is rugged and has few tributaries.

See also
List of rivers of California

References

Rivers of Mendocino County, California
Rivers of Northern California
Tributaries of the Eel River (California)